The Maltese Bippy is a 1969 film directed by Norman Panama and released by Metro-Goldwyn-Mayer. The film is a vehicle for comedy team Dan Rowan and Dick Martin, who had recently found fame in their television show Rowan & Martin's Laugh-In. "Bippy" is a catchphrase from their show.

Plot
Business has never been so bad for Sam Smith and Ernest Gray, partners in soft-core porn-film production. After their movie set is busted by the authorities, the hapless pair become prime suspects in a nearby cemetery murder. The mental pressure of near-destitution and criminal investigation becomes overwhelming for Ernest. So much so, he comes to believe he has mutated into America's first werewolf. He begins to question whether he—or rather, his lycanthropic self—might be the culprit responsible for homicide in the neighborhood graveyard.

Cast

Dan Rowan as Sam Smith
Dick Martin as Ernest Gray
Carol Lynley as Robin Sherwood
Julie Newmar as Carlotta Ravenswood
Mildred Natwick as Molly Fletcher
Fritz Weaver as Mischa Ravenswood
Robert Reed as Lt. Tim Crane
David Hurst as Dr. Charles Strauss
Dana Elcar as Sgt. Kelvaney
Leon Askin as Axel Kronstadt
Alan Oppenheimer as Adolph Springer
Eddra Gale as Helga
Arthur Batanides as Tony
Pamela Rodgers as Saundra
Jennifer Bishop as Joanna Clay
Maudie Prickett as Mrs. Potter
Garry Walberg as Harold Fenster
Carol-Jean Thompson as Mona
Jerry Mann as Joseph Wesling

See also
 List of American films of 1969

References

External links

1969 films
1960s comedy horror films
American comedy horror films
American parody films
1960s comedy mystery films
1960s English-language films
Films directed by Norman Panama
Films scored by Nelson Riddle
Films set in Queens, New York
American haunted house films
Metro-Goldwyn-Mayer films
1969 comedy films
American comedy mystery films
1960s American films